Harikrishna Pathak is a Gujarati poet, short story writer, editor and children's writer from Gujarat, India.

Life

Pathak was born on 5 August 1938 at Botad (now in Gujarat, India) to Monghiben and Ramchandra. His family was from Bholad village in Ahmedabad district. He matriculated in 1956. He completed his B. Sc. from Gujarat University in 1961. He worked as a teacher at Songadh near Bhavnagar in 1961–62. In 1963, he joined Department of Revenues, Government of Gujarat as an assistant. He was later promoted as the divisional officer and later retired as the deputy secretary. He has managed literary groups such as Mijlas and Brihaspatisabha for years. He has also served as a vice president of Gujarati Sahitya Parishad. He is also painter, sketcher and singer.

Works
Harikrishna Pathak has experimented with several genres of literature. His first work, a satire, Natakno Takhto was published in Chandani while his first poem was published in Kumar. Sooraj Kadach Uge (1974) was his first poetry collection which had 82 poems including metrical poetry, sonnets, songs, ghazals and free verse. It has traditional as well as experimental poems. Halavi Hawane Pankhe (2005), Tapu and Jalna Padgha are his other poetry collections. Adva Pachisi (1984) has parody poetry on human nature delivered through fictional character Advo. It has shades of burlesque.

Mor Banglo (1988) and Natubhaine To Jalsa Chhe (2008) are his story collections. Galine Nakethi (1993) is his collection of criticism. Nagar Vase Chhe (1978) has selected poems from Brihaspatisabha edited by him. He has also edited Gujarat Kavita Chayan (1994, 1996) as well as co-edited Swatantryottar Gujarati Geet Sanchay, Gurjar Navalika Chayan, Gurjar Adhunik Vivechan and Manubhai Trivedi - Sarod (2008). Aapni Yadi has poems of Kalapi selected by him. Raina Phool (2004) is his travelogue.

He has contributed to children's literature also. Koinu Kaik Khovay Chhe (1981) is a collection of children's poetry.  Dostarini Vato (1993) is a collection of children's stories. Gulabi Arasni Laggi (1979) is a collection of teenage experiences initially serialized in Nutan Gujarat. Hallo-Fallo (2005) is also his work on children's literature.

Awards
He has received Kumar Chandrak (1967), Chandrashekhar Thakkur Prize (1973), Critics Award (1984), Jayant Pathak Poetry Prize (1993), Narmad Suvarna Chandrak (1993, for Jalna Padgha). He has been awarded by Gujarat Sahitya Akademi also.

Personal life
He married Chandrika in 1961 at Bhavnagar and has six children.

See also
 List of Gujarati-language writers

References

1938 births
Living people
Gujarati-language poets
Gujarati-language writers
Poets from Gujarat
Indian children's writers
People from Botad district
20th-century Indian poets
Novelists from Gujarat
21st-century Indian poets
Indian male poets
Gujarat University alumni
Indian editors
Indian male short story writers
Children's poets
People from Gandhinagar